Zaliab (also Romanized as Zālīāb and Z̄ālī Āb; also known as Z̄ālyāb-e Eslāmābād) is a village in Kuhdasht-e Jonubi Rural District, in the Central District of Kuhdasht County, Lorestan Province, Iran. At the 2006 census, its population was 405, in 84 families.

References 

Towns and villages in Kuhdasht County